Grammoptera ruficornis is a species of beetle in family Cerambycidae.

Etymology
The Latin scientific name ruficornis of this species means "with red antennae".

Subspecies
Subspecies include:
Grammoptera ruficornis subsp. flavipes Pic, 1892
Grammoptera ruficornis subsp. ruficornis (Fabricius, 1781)

Distribution
This species can be found in the Palearctic realm. It is present in most of Europe (Albania, Austria, Belarus, Belgium, Bosnia and Herzegovina, Bulgaria, Croatia, Czech Republic, Denmark, Estonia, France, Germany, Greece, Hungary, Ireland, Italy, Latvia, Lithuania, Luxembourg, Moldova, Montenegro, Netherlands, Norway, Poland, Portugal, Romania, Russia, Serbia, Slovakia, Slovenia, Spain, Sweden, Switzerland, Ukraine and United Kingdom), in Caucasus, Transcaucasia, Turkey, Azerbaijan and Iran.

Habitat
These longhorns are linked to deciduous forest and they occur in forests, glades, pastures and old deciduous trees.

Description
Females are longer and wider than males. These small longicorns have a stretched and densely punctate body (pronotum and elytra), not very narrow at the back, with silky hairs on the elytra. Eyes are rather close to the jaw base. The color is dark brown or black, with long yellow-red antennae that are almost as long as the body and show an elongate 2nd segment. Also the legs are partly yellowish red, with bulbous bicoloured femora, but hind femora sometimes are entirely black.

Biology
Adults are found feeding on Carolina buckthorn (Rhamnus cathartica), European beech (Fagus sylvatica), Alder buckthorn (Frangula alnus), Pedunculate oak (Quercus robur) and Manna Ash (Fraxinus ornus), Buck's-beard (Aruncus dioicus), Ground-elder (Aegopodium podagraria), hawthorn  (Crataegus monogyna), Anthriscus and Rosa canina in Spring and Summer. The larvae develop in fungi infested dead branches of deciduous trees. The larval development is annual and the adult hatches from the end of May to the middle of June. The adults are usually seen in flowers of hawthorn Crataegus monogyna, rowan (Sorbus aucuparia), whitebeam (Sorbus intermedia), cow parsley (Anthriscus sylvestris) and Apiaceae.

Some parasitoid's (Dolichomitus agnoscendus, Ichneumonidae and Cenocoelius aartseni, Braconidae) live in close association with these longhorns.

Gallery

References

External links
 Cerambycidae - Longhorn beetles of the West Palearctic region
 Nature Spot
 Eakring Birds

Lepturinae
Beetles described in 1781